Derdas was the name of a series of kings of ancient Elimiotis:

Derdas I
Derdas II
Derdas III